Gopalpur or Gopālpur is a village in the Pirojpur District in the Barisal Division of southwestern Bangladesh.

References

Populated places in Pirojpur District